Louis Frank Schneider (December 19, 1901 – September 22, 1942) was an American racecar driver.  He won the 1931 Indianapolis 500.

Biography
"Louie" Schneider was born in Indianapolis on December 19, 1901.  He graduated from School No. 49, and later attended Shortridge High School, Ohio Military Institute, and Culver Military Academy.

Schneider started racing on dirt tracks in the east and midwest in 1920.  He was an Indianapolis motorcycle policeman in the mid-20s, and later participated in many motorcycle races.  In the fall of 1926, he entered AAA-sanctioned competition driving a car owned by racing enthusiast Mike Boyle.

(This was the race in which Billy Arnold took the lead after lap 2 and led the entire remaining 198 laps to win the race, setting an all-time record.)

The following year, 1931, Schneider achieved the greatest success of his racing career when he won the 19th running of the Indianapolis 500 as well as that year's AAA national championship.  He is one of only two drivers to win the Indianapolis 500 who were born in Indianapolis (the other was Bill Cummings).

His last race at Indianapolis was in 1933, but he continued to compete in dirt track and midget car racing.  In 1934, he was accompanied by Clay Ballinger of Indianapolis and Buddy Rusch and James Triplett of Chicago on a two-month racing trip to Buenos Aires, Argentina.

At the Indy track in 1937, he was involved in an incident with that year's Indy 500 winner Wilbur Shaw.  During Shaw's post-race celebration (his 1st of 3 wins), his old nemesis Lou Schneider appeared on the other side of the fence, and, in Shaw's words, "made some sneering remark about me being a lucky so-and-so, and his smart crack touched me off like a skyrocket.  I went over the fence like a monkey, landed on the other side, and hit Louis right on the nose faster than I can tell about it."

Schneider suffered a broken arm and facial bruises in a nasty midget crash while qualifying for a program at City Stadium in San Diego on April 3, 1938.  Newspaper articles from later in the year reported his return to racing, though it isn't known for certain that he took part in those racing programs.  He died of tuberculosis on September 22, 1942 at age 40, after a three-month stay at Flower Mission Hospital in Indianapolis.  Owing to an erroneous wire report at the time of his death, the cause of his death has been widely misreported as being from racing injuries, but tuberculosis is the sole cause of death listed on his Indiana death certificate.

Schneider is buried at Crown Hill Cemetery in Indianapolis.

Indianapolis 500 results

References

External links

 

1901 births
1942 deaths
Culver Academies alumni
Racing drivers from Indianapolis
Champ Car champions
Indianapolis 500 drivers
Indianapolis 500 winners
AAA Championship Car drivers
20th-century deaths from tuberculosis
Tuberculosis deaths in Indiana
Burials at Crown Hill Cemetery